The southwestern water vole or southern water vole (Arvicola sapidus) is a large amphibious vole native to most of France and southwestwards through Spain and Portugal.  It is listed on the IUCN Red List as vulnerable. Although historically considered to be a member of the same species as the European water vole, Musser and Carleton (2005) considered it distinct enough to warrant full species status.  It is threatened for many of the same reasons as the European water vole, and a campaign is currently underway to seek protection for the species, both at a national level and at European Union level.

It was traditionally one of the main ingredients in the Valencian dish called paella.

References

Sources 
Musser, G. G. and M. D. Carleton. 2005. Superfamily Muroidea. pp. 894–1531 in Mammal Species of the World a Taxonomic and Geographic Reference. D. E. Wilson and D. M. Reeder eds. Johns Hopkins University Press, Baltimore.

Arvicola
Vole, Southwestern water
Vulnerable animals
Vulnerable biota of Europe
Mammals described in 1908